Maria Lani (Maria Jeleniewicz; 24 June 1895 – 1954) was an aspiring film actress and artists' model. In the late 1920s she was portrayed in paintings and sculpture by over fifty artists, including Bonnard, Chagall, Cocteau, Derain, Matisse,  Rouault, and Suzanne Valadon.

Biography
Maria Lani was born in Kolno, Poland and grew up in Częstochowa also in Poland. She went to Paris in the Spring of 1928 and proclaimed herself to be a silent film star who had worked in Berlin. Together with her husband, Maximilian Abramowicz, and her brother, Alexander, the trio claimed to be working on a film which required multiple portraits as part of the plot. She befriended Jean Cocteau who enthusiastically endorsed the project and with his encouragement, fifty-nine artists made portraits of her.

A limited edition book about Lani and the portraits was published in 1929 by Éditions des Quatre Chemins, Paris with essays by Cocteau, Mac Ramo, and Waldemar George. It included fifty-one plates of reproductions.

The film never materialized, but the portraits were exhibited as a group in Europe and the United States, and Lani and Abramowicz kept them in their possession. In 1941 they moved to New York City, where she worked at the Stage Door Canteen, a recreational center for servicemen. They returned to Paris after the war where she died in 1954 and was buried in a pauper's grave.

Notes
In the late 1930s, Thomas Mann coauthored a screen play that was inspired by Lani. "Jean Renoir agreed to direct, with Garbo to star."
The 3 December 1945 issue of Life Magazine reproduced fifteen of the portraits.
Lani was an inspiration for fashion designer John Galliano's spring/summer collection in 2011 and he referenced the portraits in the outfits of the models.

References

External links

1895 births
1954 deaths
People from Kolno
French artists' models